Central Solomons was a single-member constituency of the Legislative Council of the Solomon Islands. It was created in 1967 and abolished in 1970 when the Governing Council was created. Its sole elected member, John Plant Hoka stood for re-election in the Ngella/Savo/Russells constituency in the 1970 elections.

List of MPs

Election results

References

Legislative Council of the Solomon Islands constituencies
1967 establishments in the Solomon Islands
Constituencies established in 1967
1970 disestablishments in the Solomon Islands
Constituencies disestablished in 1970